Jonathan Sriranganathan (Sri) is a Queensland Greens councillor for the Brisbane City Council, representing The Gabba Ward.

Early life and education
Sriranganathan has a Bachelor of Laws (Hons) and Bachelor of Arts with majors in Journalism and Aboriginal and Torres Strait Islander Studies from The University of Queensland. He has previously worked at a corporate law firm. Prior to being elected he was a musician and beat poet.

Political career

2015 State Election 
Sriranganathan stood as the Greens candidate for South Brisbane at the 2015 Queensland state election, where he received 21.8% of the primary vote. He was defeated by former Labor MP Jackie Trad, and placed third after the Liberal National Party.

2016 Brisbane City Council Election 
Sriranganathan stood as a candidate for The Gabba Ward at the 2016 Brisbane City Council election, held on 19 March, where he received 31.7% of the primary vote. Preferences from the Labor candidate, Nicole Lessio, gave Cr Sriranganathan 55% of the two-party-preferred vote, and he declared victory on 23 March after receiving a concession call from Lessio.

He was sworn in on 12 April 2016, becoming the first Greens councillor anywhere in Queensland, and the first of Sri Lankan Tamil heritage.

In 2016, Sriranganathan organised human barricades and protests against the controversial West Village development in West End. The development still went ahead but significant changes were made to the design.

In 2018, Sriranganathan was accused of harassing and stalking a local real estate agent. Official investigations were launched into the complaint and the Brisbane City Council opted not to pursue misconduct charges.

Cr Sriranganathan believes the Queensland Police is a violent and racist organisation.

In October 2019, Sriranganathan was fined $1,300 for "inappropriate conduct" by the Councillor Conduct Review Panel, after "posing as a concerned resident in a hoax voicemail" left for state MP Jennifer Howard.

2020 Brisbane City Council Election 
Sriranganathan stood as a candidate for The Gabba Ward at the 2020 Brisbane City Council election, held on 28 March, where he received 45.6% of the primary vote, an increase of 13.9% from the previous election.

Beliefs 

Sriranganathan has campaigned for a right to the city, and has argued that the function of cities should be centred around democratic control rather than capital accumulation. He is supportive of "public disobedience" as a valid form of political action and has posted information to assist followers in avoiding being fined. He has criticised the behaviour of the Queensland Police Service, describing them as a "violent and racist" institution.

Personal life 
Sriranganathan lives on a houseboat moored in the Brisbane River with his partner, stating his purpose for this as wanting to donate half of his $157,782 salary.

He is a saxophonist and vocalist with Brisbane band The Mouldy Lovers. He is known for his spoken word performances.

References 

Year of birth missing (living people)
Living people
Politicians from Brisbane
Musicians from Brisbane
Australian Greens politicians
Australian people of Sri Lankan Tamil descent
Queensland local councillors
Extinction Rebellion